G. D. Birla Memorial School is a secondary and senior secondary school offering education to over 200 students from grades 4 through 12. It was established in 1987 in memory of the Indian industrialist Ghanshyam Das Birla by its founders Syt. B K Birla (Basant Kumar Birla) and Smt. Sarla Birla. in Ranikhet, Almora, India.

Campus 
The school is in the Almora district of Uttarakhand, a state in Northern India. The school also provides residential accommodation for its students on its  campus.

References

External links
 School website

Boys' schools in India
High schools and secondary schools in Uttarakhand
Boarding schools in Uttarakhand
Almora district
Educational institutions established in 1987
1987 establishments in Uttar Pradesh